Veronica Gorrie (sometimes referred to as Heritage-Gorrie, born 1971/1972) is an Aboriginal Australian writer. She is a Krauatungalang Gunai woman. Her first book, Black and Blue: A memoir of racism and resilience, a memoir reflecting on her Aboriginality and the decade she spent in the police force, was released in 2021. Black and Blue won Australia's richest literary award, the Victorian Prize for Literature, in 2022.

Personal life
Gorrie was born in 1971 or 1972, daughter of John (a Gunai man of the Krauatungalang clan) and Heather (a white first-generation Australian). John is a former Aboriginal liaison officer and child protection worker who was the first known Aboriginal man to receive a Public Service Medal.

Gorrie grew up in Morwell, Victoria, and has lived in various locations in Australia including Brisbane, Mount Isa, Toongabbie, Bundaberg and Biloela. As of 2021, she lives in Victoria.

She has three children, Nayuka, Paul and Likarri. Nayuka is a writer, actor and activist who has appeared on ABC's Black Comedy and Q+A.

Career
Beginning in 2001, Gorrie worked as a police officer in the Queensland Police Service. While she joined the force wanting to "help to eliminate or eradicate the fear and mistrust [Aboriginal] people have towards police," she has since discussed "witness[ing] brutality, excessive use of force, black deaths in custody and ongoing racism" during her time in the occupation, and was medically discharged in 2011. Since her retirement, she has sharply criticised Australian police, claiming they are "mainly white, dominated by men, and built on systemic racism, misogyny, homophobia, and bullying."

After her retirement from police work, she embarked upon a writing career, appearing at the 2020 and 2021 Emerging Writers' Festivals and the 2021 Sydney Writers' Festival. Her first book, Black and Blue: A memoir of racism and resilience, was published by Scribe in 2021. The book is written in two parts, Black and Blue, which focus on her Aboriginality and time in the police respectively. The book has received generally positive reviews. Meriki Onus in Australian Book Review called it "an enthralling book" and "a beautiful story of survival and family," and Jessie Tu in The Sydney Morning Herald declared that it "astonishes with its degree of truth, trauma and resilience" and that it "should be mandatory reading material for all emerging and current cops". Meanwhile, in a more negative review in Kill Your Darlings, Fernanda Dahlstrom remarked that "[g]reater exploration of how she came to abolitionism, and some signposting of where the story was going, would have strengthened this account of her struggle with racism and disadvantage from both sides of the law."

The book won both the Victorian Premier's Literary Award for Indigenous Writing and the Victorian Prize for Literature (Australia's richest literary award, with a $100,000 prize) in 2022. It was also nominated for that year's Victorian Premier's Prize for Nonfiction, but lost to Amani Haydar's The Mother Wound. It was also shortlisted for the Douglas Stewart Prize for Nonfiction at the 2022 New South Wales Premier's Literary Awards.

Her first play, "Nullung" ("paternal grandmother" in Gunai), based on an extract from Black and Blue about her grandmother, was presented as a play reading by Melbourne Theatre Company in 2021, the first known time the Gunai language was featured in a stage performance.

References

External links
Veronica Gorrie's profile at The Wheeler Centre

Living people
1970s births
People from Morwell, Victoria
Indigenous Australian writers
21st-century Australian women writers
21st-century Australian non-fiction writers
Australian women memoirists
Queensland police officers
Women police officers
Gunaikurnai people